Llanfugail is a village in Anglesey, in north-west Wales. in the community of Llanfachraeth.

References

Villages in Anglesey
Bodedern